KIWA (1550 AM) is a commercial radio station serving the Sheldon, Iowa area.  The station primarily broadcasts a news/talk format.  They also broadcast full coverage of local sports.

KIWA and sister station KIWA-FM are owned by the Sheldon Broadcasting Company, Inc. Studios are located at 411 9th St. 
in Sheldon. The stations also share a transmitter site behind the National Guard facility, on Sheldon's west side.

External links
KIWA website

IWA
Sheldon, Iowa